William J. Grimes (born 1886) was an English professional footballer who played as a winger.

Career
Born in Hitchin, Grimes played for Glossop, Bradford City and Derby County.

For Bradford City he made 17 appearances in the Football League.

Personal life 
Grimes was married to Ameila Furr, sister of the footballing brothers George, Harry, Vic and Willie Furr.

Sources

References

1886 births
Year of death missing
English footballers
Glossop North End A.F.C. players
Bradford City A.F.C. players
Derby County F.C. players
English Football League players
Association football wingers
Sportspeople from Hitchin